White Rock is a locality in the City of Ipswich, Queensland, Australia. In the  White Rock had a population of 3 people.

Geography
The majority of land in White Rock remains covered in natural vegetation.  In the far north west, the Centenary Motorway links Springfield with the Cunningham Highway to the west.  The western half of White Rock lies with the catchment of the Bremer River and the eastern half within the Brisbane River catchment.

History 
White Rock is situated in the Yugarabul traditional Aboriginal country of the Brisbane and surrounding regions.

In the  White Rock had a population of 3 people.

Attractions

The White Rock Conservation Park, now known as the White Rock – Spring Mountain Conservation Estate, is accessed by White Rock Drive from Redbank Plains.  It is used for bushwalking and horse riding during the day.  No camping or pets are permitted.

References 

City of Ipswich
Localities in Queensland